Estelle Asmodelle, formerly known as Estelle Maria Croot, is a polymath. She is an Australian model, actress, belly dancer, musician, activist, abstract artist and physicist. She became Australia's first legally recognised transgender person registered with the Births, Deaths and Marriages Department of New South Wales on the 13th October 1987. In 1986, she was labelled "Australia’s First Sex-Change Pin-up Girl". She was said to be the most photographed transgender person in Australia. Estelle was a controversial figure in the 1980s and as such her story has also appeared in books as well.

Early life
Estelle Asmodelle was the first-born child of Silvia and Barry Croot. The father’s side of the family was Latvian and the mother’s side was English. Estelle has one sibling by the name of Belinda. Estelle grew up in the small town of Berrima on the Southern Highlands of NSW and attended St Paul’s Primary School in Moss Vale and then Chevalier College in Bowral. At school, Estelle was considered gifted in science and art and often won school prizes. At the end of year 9, Estelle contracted meningitis while on holiday in Narooma. She was in a coma for three weeks and in a wheelchair for three months, then at a convalescent hospital recuperating for nine months. To the amazement of the doctors, she made a full recovery from the serious infection. The following year she was enrolled at Moss Vale high school for year 10. Several IQ tests were performed yet the result was never revealed.

On weekends she played drums in a band called the N-lets, that worked in some of the alternative venues in Sydney's independent music scene.

At university, she experienced transphobic discrimination from members of the academic staff. It was a devastating time for Estelle, for the dream of study and perhaps a life in academia seemed broken. As a result she left the university to focus on art and music. She became a dancer, believing that dance was the true artistic synthesis of art and music.

Dance career
After leaving Wollongong University, Estelle worked briefly as an assistant photographer, while attending dance classes at Sydney Dance Company and also with an Authentic Egyptian Dance instructor. Six weeks after starting belly dance classes she gained work as a dancer.

As time passed she worked in many shows both in Australia and Asia. Estelle toured through Singapore, East and West Malaysia, Thailand, Taiwan and Japan. She was typically featured as the variety act for such shows as Esma Duo, Paris by Night, Las Vegas Under Lights and Les Girls. During her time dancing, she also gained part-time work modelling as well. She returned to Australia and worked as a solo belly dancer.

Activism
During Estelle's dance career she travelled to Asian countries and faced many legal difficulties, especially in Singapore where she was detained and placed under house arrest during her stay in the country, because her passport denoted an M (for male). She suffered serious problems with various customs officials and became determined to change the laws in Australia.  At that time Australia's Department of Foreign Affairs and Trade policy was to deny passports bearing the gender designation F to transgender women even if they had undergone sex reassignment surgery.

Estelle continually sent letters and requests to the Attorney's General's Department of the Australian Government and eventually received confirmation that her requests were answered. Others had also been lobbying for changes to the New South Wales government for the right to amend birth certificates. However, Estelle had written the Attorney-General of N.S.W. so many times, in 1987 they called and invited her to be the first person to have her birth certificate amended. This amendment made her the first legally recognised transsexual in Australia. Months later, as a result of this action, passport sex designation was allowed to be amended as well. A year later Estelle lobbied for anti-discrimination laws to be amended and also for the state hospitals ethics boards to allow research into ectopic pregnancy for sex-change women.

Estelle continues to offer support for the Trans community. News.com.au recently quoted her support for Trans kids.

Publicity
Estelle has been featured in a large number of newspaper and magazine articles, including Truth (Dec 14 1985), The Sun Herald (Jan 12, 1986), Mercury (Jan 20, 1986 & Oct 10 1987), Sydney Morning Herald (Feb 14 1983 & May 8, 1986), The Sunday Times (May 10, 1986), Daily Mirror (Oct 9 & Oct 13 1987), The Highlands Post (Jan 10 1986 & Oct 21 1987), Cleo (May 1987), People (Nov 1985 & 1993), Post (Dec 1988 Sep 1992), Penthouse Forum (1986 & 1991), New Idea (March 1986), She (July 1996), New Woman (June 1992 & 1998), Naughty Sydney (Cover – November 1991), Tomadachi (June 1991), Wellbeing (May 1989 & 1993), and Nature & Health (November 1997). There have been Greek, UK and USA newspapers as well but only Australian ones are listed here.

She made more than 100 radio interviews and dozens of television appearances in Australia and Japan as well, including Where Are They Now? (Channel 7), Sex/Life (Channel 10 TEN), Midday Show with Kerri Anne (Channel 9), World View (NHK Japan), Beat Takeashi (NHK Japan), Good Morning Australia (Channel 10), Day by Day (Channel 9), Vox Populi (SBS), A Current Affair (Channel 10), Midday Show with Ray Martin (Channel 9), and Terry Willisee Tonight (Channel 9).

Estelle continues to support other trans people who have become public about their transition. In 2015 Estelle offered support to Caitlyn Jenner when she came out as trans.

Film work
After the media attention, she garnered considerable publicity in Australia but decided to live in Japan for a period of four and a half years, where she worked as a model 1988–1992. It was there that she made her film debut, a walk-in and walk-out part, in a film by Japanese director Yoshimitsu Morita, entitled "24 Hour Playboy (Ai to heisei no iro - Otoko)(1989)". It was made for the local Japanese market and never made it out of Japan.
On returning to Australia, her next film was The Enchanted Dance, a documentary film about authentic belly dancing. It went international on video but was not released on DVD.

In 2000 Estelle lived and modelled in Los Angeles while completing a Diploma in acting at the Lena Harris Studio 

Estelle was recently ranked by the Internet Movie Database IMDB number 22 in the top 70 Celebrities Who are Actually Transgender People.

Filmography
Previous films - which are listed on IMDB:
 1989 – Ai to heisei no iro – Otoko (24 Hour Playboy)
 1992 – Secret Fantasies
 1994 – The Enchanted Dance

Modelling

Earlier on in her modelling career, she became "Australia's First Transsexual Pin-up" by appearing nude in Australian Playgirl. Unlike the US version of the magazine, the publication featured women and not men, and it was the first time a trans woman had appeared nude in a mainstream magazine in Australia. Estelle Asmodelle was the face of the Supermodel Agency in Australia; she was their spokesperson and main model during 1996–2000.

Abstract art
Estelle started painting abstract pieces from early childhood and while at Wollongong University, started creating large canvases. Her first solo exhibition was at Wollongong Regional Art Gallery, (now called the Wollongong City Gallery). During her varied career, Estelle continued to paint and exhibit, and while living in Japan also exhibited at the Tokyo Metropolitan Art Museum as part of the UNESCO International Friendship Exhibition in 1991. Estelle also started the Tokyo Eki (train station) Exhibition, displaying and selling her work in Shinjuku, Ikebukuro and Tokyo.

Estelle was also involved in group shows in Los Angeles, at the Los Angeles Center For Digital Art LACDA. Since returning to Australia, Estelle has continued to exhibit in both solo exhibitions in Sydney and country NSW, as well as in group shows, one example is the Redfern Artist Group. Her work has been exhibited in Tokyo, Los Angeles, Melbourne, Sydney and regional NSW. Estelle has had numerous solo shows and participated in over 100 group shows, and her art website details some of her work at 'Abstract Artist'.

In 2010 Estelle published her first art book, entitled "Transience".

Estelle has continued to paint during her varied career, while she usually gains considerable publicity in all her activities. The Art Blog, ran a piece on her in 2016 about her abstract art,. Additionally, she has stated on her profile on Art Finder, that she is to launch another book in 2021 about her abstract art, entitled, "Abstraction". She also has a profile on the Bluethumb art portal She is in the top 10 best selling artists on Bluethumb. Estelle is also represented by Art Lovers Australia and is also a top seller through that portal as well. As time goes by Asmodelle's art continues to gain more attention with very many awards and articles being published about her work. Estelle's artworks often appear in many publication around the world, here is an example in Vogue Germany. Art Lovers Australia, who is one of the art portals in Australia that represent Estelle's art, did an interview with her in October 2022.

Estelle has won dozens of art awards, in recent years a few of those are: Winner at Art Show International 2021 and also 2022, highly commended at the 2020 Abstracts Art Exhibition at J. Mane Gallery., and winner at Artavita International in both 2020 and 2019.

From 2021 Estelle's artistic reputation has grown internationally, as have her sales. Estelle is featured in New York Glamour magazine in August 2021  and also her work appears on the Cover, as well as a feature article, in the French Arts Magazine Mozaïk No 3. In November 2022 Louis Vuitton's newest store at Hanshin Dome in Taiwan purchased Estelle's artwork and highlight the work in their lavish store, while Vogue November 2022 in Taiwan and Marie Claire November 2022 both covered the story and mentioned Estelle art.

Career change
While modelling in Japan, Estelle also worked for several large Japanese technology companies as a technical consultant, these companies were: Hitachi, Nachi-Fujikoshi, and NSK. It was the start of a career change, returning to an academic life. During that time, she developed several new technology patents. In 1987, her designs of improved active magnetic bearing technology were funded by the Japanese companies, but were never manufactured due to expensive costs of production, which used a laser guidance system. Estelle's designs have been cited in the engineering field as a novel breakthrough in technological development. Estelle's patents in the Croot surname, and in the Asmodelle surname.

Upon returning to Australia Estelle continued her technical consultant work alongside her modelling and painting. Then in 1998 she formed her own internet company, Ellenet Pty. Ltd. Calling on background in computers. According to media reports, Estelle has become something of an internet entrepreneur and continues to build a significant online presence. In 2016 Ellenet Pty. Ltd. was sold to Sandgate Solutions in Australia for an undisclosed sum.

Since 2005 Estelle has also been recording composition of electronic music. Many music magazines feature her CDs and often write reviews such as a review in Evil Sponge. Other publicity for her activity includes Vents Magazine and Urban Mainstream Magazine.

In 2008 Estelle returned to academia, studying at the University of Central Lancashire in the field of astronomy.

Music and writing
Estelle has worked in film career and has also written an autobiography, "Anaesthetic Dream".

Estelle has written two books:

 2021 – Anaesthetic Dream - an autobiography (Due for global publication early 2023)
 2013 – Cosmology - the Ultimate Introduction (University & College release in 2013)

She has also written four screenplays, which have not been optioned.

 Edge of Fear
 Finding Jewel
 I Love Sushi
 Pleasure Girl

The screenplay "Pleasure Girl" has done well at film festivals. Award winner in its category (Script (Science Fiction)) at the 2018 Los Angeles Film and Script Festival, Award winner in its category (Script (Science Fiction)) at the Best Script Award London, England 2020 (November 24, 2020), Official Selection at The Tokyo Lift-Off Film Festival 2020 (May 31, 2020), and also an Official Selection at Miami International Science Fiction Film Festival (MiSciFi) 2021 (February 26, 2021). Pleasure Girl, has won a total of eight awards in independent film festivals.

Working as a musician Estelle Asmodelle simply goes by the name "Asmodelle".

Estelle has released seven albums, and all are available at online outlets, while her website also said they were released physically:

 2009 – Electronic Mischief
 2010 – Transelectric
 2010 – Dark Universe
 2012 – Asmelectrix
 2013 – Grooveatropolis Vol I 
 2013 – Electronic Mischief II
 2014 – Near Earth Landscape
 2015 – Dark Universe II
 2015 – Monotonic Meditations
 2015 – Improvera - Quite Moments
 2016 – Grooveatropolis Vol II - The Melodies

In early 2011, Estelle was signed to a major music distribution label: "Blue Pie Records" as a featured artist, for the worldwide distribution of her albums. but during early 2013 she moved over to Mondotunes distribution.

She is a featured artist on Triple J's Unearthed as well. In 2014 she released 5th Album Grooveatropolis, through Mondo Tunes worldwide: Asmodelle on Mondo Tunes.

Estelle has won many awards for her music as well. Her music video won an award at the Australian Independent Music Video Awards, for a category: Best Instrumental Music Video – Australia 2012, for the track: Hybrid from the Asmelectrix album. In September 2015, Estelle became a Bronze Medal Winner, with Grooveatropolis Vol I She has also won a Bronze medal for Improvera - Quite Moments, contemporary minimal piano improvisation as well. In 2016 Estelle's music was nominated for the 2016 Australian Independent Music Awards.

Academia
Estelle published several papers with the peer-reviewed Journal of the Institute of Science and Technology. Between late 2010 to mid 2011 she joined the part-time staff of Cosmos as a science writer, in the field of physics/space, and published six articles. In 2015 Estelle published two articles about Einstein in the Asian Journal of Physics 2015: An Einstein Anniversary Edition. Other papers published by Estelle Asmodelle can be found on Google Scholar 

Estelle was an active student member of the Institute of Physics in the UK, a full member of the Newcastle Astronomical Society, a student member of the Australasian Society for General Relativity & Gravitation, and runs her own astronomy and cosmology blog, "Relative Cosmos". In late 2011, as a result of Estelle's Cosmos magazine articles, several astronomical societies asked her to give presentations on astronomy and cosmology. She has given four presentations each since on areas such as "Cosmology and the role of the General Theory of Relativity", "GAIA: the Dawn of High Precision Micro-Arcsecond Astrometry", and "Water on the Moon". Some of the societies in question are Newcastle Astronomical Society (NAS), Sutherland Astronomical Society and Astronomical Society of New South Wales.

In June 2012, Estelle became a member of the Australasian Society for General Relativity and Gravitation (ASGRG). In May 2013 also became a member of the International Society on General Relativity and Gravitation (ISGRG). Author John Gribbin has acknowledged her efforts with validating Einstein's sources. Other authors have cited her work as well.

In early 2013 Estelle was invited to become a Fellow of the Institute of Science and Technology IST. Additionally, in May 2013 the Express Advocate published an article about an introduction to cosmology Estelle was running at the Central Coast Community College on the Ourimbah campus of Newcastle University, in the Central Coast of NSW.

In 2017, Estelle completed a degree with the University of Central Lancashire through their Study Astronomy portal, with a BSc astronomy [honors]. Estelle graduated in 2017 with a 1st class honours. During the 8 years of study, the university has acknowledged her efforts

In January 2018, Estelle started a PhD, on a full scholarship, at the Centre for Quantum Computation & Communication Technology, School of Mathematics and Physics, University of Queensland, working in the field of quantum mechanics and relativity. Estelle suspended her PhD with the University of Queensland in 2020. In that same year Estelle studied a Graduate Certificate in Mathematics at University of New England (Australia) (UNE). Although she has planned to begin a second PhD at Sydney University and the Centre for Time.

References

External links

 
 Autobiography: Anaesthetic Dream
 Astronomy & Cosmology Blog
 Music portal with Asmodelle's Music
 Asmodelle's Art Website
 

Living people
Australian female dancers
Australian electronic musicians
New-age musicians
Ambient musicians
Abstract expressionist artists
21st-century Australian astronomers
Australian film actresses
Australian non-fiction writers
Australian women screenwriters
Belly dancers
Australian LGBT musicians
Australian LGBT rights activists
People from Bowral
Transgender actresses
Transgender artists
Transgender writers
Transgender scientists
Transgender female models
University of Wollongong alumni
People associated with the University of Central Lancashire
Alumni of the University of Central Lancashire
Women astronomers
Australian women in electronic music
Australian LGBT actors
Year of birth missing (living people)
Transgender women musicians